Montserrado-4 is an electoral district for the elections to the House of Representatives of Liberia. The district covers the Paynesville communities of Kemah Town/Omega, Soul Clinc, Duport Road North, Duport Road North East, Duport Road South and Paynesville Joe Bar.

Elected representatives

References

Electoral districts in Liberia